Lake Almanor West is a census-designated place (CDP) in Plumas County, California, United States. The population was 270 at the 2010 census, down from 329 at the 2000 census.

Geography
Lake Almanor West is located at  (40.235246, -121.204180), along the southwest shore of Lake Almanor.  It is locally referred to as "West Shore."

Demographics

2010
The 2010 United States Census reported that Lake Almanor West had a population of 270. The racial makeup of Lake Almanor West was 259 (95.9%) White, 1 (0.4%) African American, 1 (0.4%) Native American, 0 (0.0%) Asian, 1 (0.4%) Pacific Islander, 1 (0.4%) from other races, and 7 (2.6%) from two or more races. Hispanic or Latino of any race were 11 persons (4.1%).

The Census reported that 270 people (100% of the population) lived in households, 0 (0%) lived in non-institutionalized group quarters, and 0 (0%) were institutionalized.

There were 134 households, out of which 8 (6.0%) had children under the age of 18 living in them, 108 (80.6%) were opposite-sex married couples living together, 3 (2.2%) had a female householder with no husband present, 2 (1.5%) had a male householder with no wife present.  There were 3 (2.2%) unmarried opposite-sex partnerships, and 0 (0%) same-sex married couples or partnerships. 20 households (14.9%) were made up of individuals, and 13 (9.7%) had someone living alone who was 65 years of age or older. The average household size was 2.01.  There were 113 families (84.3% of all households); the average family size was 2.17.

The population was spread out, with 12 people (4.4%) under the age of 18, 3 people (1.1%) aged 18 to 24, 16 people (5.9%) aged 25 to 44, 99 people (36.7%) aged 45 to 64, and 140 people (51.9%) who were 65 years of age or older.  The median age was 65.4 years. For every 100 females, there were 107.7 males.  For every 100 females age 18 and over, there were 106.4 males.

The homeowner vacancy rate was 7.2%; the rental vacancy rate was 40.0%.  261 people (96.7% of the population) lived in owner-occupied housing units and 9 people (3.3%) lived in rental housing units.

2000
As of the census of 2000, there were 329 people, 165 households, and 134 families residing in the CDP. The racial makeup of the CDP was 98.78% White, 0.30% from other races, and 0.91% from two or more races. Hispanic or Latino of any race were 1.82% of the population.

There were 165 households, out of which 7.3% had children under the age of 18 living with them, 78.8% were married couples living together, 1.8% had a female householder with no husband present, and 18.2% were non-families. 15.8% of all households were made up of individuals, and 8.5% had someone living alone who was 65 years of age or older.  The average household size was 1.99 and the average family size was 2.19.

In the CDP, the population was spread out, with 7.0% under the age of 18, 0.3% from 18 to 24, 9.4% from 25 to 44, 45.6% from 45 to 64, and 37.7% who were 65 years of age or older.  The median age was 60 years. For every 100 females, there were 104.3 males.  For every 100 females age 18 and over, there were 97.4 males.

The median income for a household in the CDP was $48,092, and the median income for a family was $49,539. Males had a median income of $80,102 versus $42,875 for females. The per capita income for the CDP was $29,294.  About 13.0% of families and 13.4% of the population were below the poverty line, including 48.0% of those under age 18 and 5.5% of those age 65 or over.

Politics

References

Census-designated places in Plumas County, California
Census-designated places in California